Campus Geesseknäppchen is a campus in Luxembourg City, in southern Luxembourg, that is shared by a number of academic institutions.

The campus is located in the southwest of the city, just to the north of the terminus of the A4 motorway. It is predominantly in the quarter of Hollerich, although the western part (including the Conservatoire) lies in Merl.

Geesseknäppchen is the site of:

 Athénée de Luxembourg
 Conservatoire de Luxembourg
 International School of Luxembourg
 Lycée Aline Mayrisch
 Lycée Michel Rodange
 Lycée Technique Ecole de Commerce et de Gestion

The campus has shared sporting facilities, including an athletics track, five sports halls, an Olympic size swimming pool, and a football (soccer) pitch.

The Japanese Supplementary School in Luxembourg (ルクセンブルグ補習授業校 Rukusenburugu Hoshū Jugyō Kō), a Japanese supplementary school, is located on the premises of the International School of Luxembourg. Its operations began there in 1991 and it serves students aged 6 to 15.

References

Year of establishment missing
Education in Luxembourg City
Geography of Luxembourg City
Campuses